Kadmiel: before God; i.e., his servant, one of the Levites who returned with Zerubbabel from the Babylonian captivity.

6th-century BCE Jews